"Barba" Luka Kaliterna (13 October 1893 – 25 February 1984) was a Croatian football player and later manager. Born in Split, he played on the position of the goalkeeper.

See also 
Fabjan Kaliterna

References

External links
Luka Kaliterna biography at HNK Hajduk Split official website 

 

1893 births
1984 deaths
Footballers from Split, Croatia
Croatian footballers
HNK Hajduk Split players
Yugoslav football managers
Croatian football managers
HNK Hajduk Split managers
RNK Split managers
HNK Rijeka managers
NK Zadar managers
Association football goalkeepers
Burials at Lovrinac Cemetery